Achyra protealis is a moth in the family Crambidae. It was described by Warren in 1892. It is endemic to Peru.

References

Moths described in 1892
Moths of South America
Pyraustinae
Taxa named by William Warren (entomologist)